A shruti box (sruti box or surpeti) is an instrument, originating from the Indian subcontinent, that traditionally works on a system of bellows. It is similar to a harmonium and is used to provide a drone in a practice session or concert of Indian classical music. It is used as an accompaniment to other instruments and notably the flute. The shruti box is also used in classical singing. In classical singing, the shruti box is used to help tune the voice. The use of the shruti box has widened with the cross-cultural influences of world music and new-age music to provide a drone for many other instruments as well as vocalists and mantra singing.

Adjustable buttons allow tuning. Nowadays, electronic shruti boxes are commonly used, which are called shruthi pettige in Kannada, shruti petti in Tamil and Telugu and sur peti in Hindi.
Recent versions also allow for changes to be made in the tempo, and the notes such as Madhyamam, Nishadam to be played in place of the usual three notes (i.e., Lower shadjam, panchamam, and the upper shadjam).

History
Before the arrival of the harmonium in the Indian subcontinent, musicians used either a tambura or a specific pitch reference instrument, such as the nadaswaram, to produce the drone. Some forms of music such as Yakshagana used the pungi reedpipe as drone. After the Western small pump harmonium became popular, musicians would modify the harmonium to automatically produce the reference pitch. Typically, one would open up the cover and adjust the stop of the harmonium to produce a drone.

Later, a keyless version of the harmonium was invented for the specific purpose of producing the drone sound. It was given the name shruti box or sruti box. These types of instruments had controls on the top or on the side of the box for controlling the pitch.

The shruti box is enjoying a renaissance in the West amongst traditional and contemporary musicians, who are using it for a range of different styles. In the early nineties, traditional Irish singer Nóirín Ní Riain brought the shruti box to Ireland, giving it a minor place in traditional Irish music. More recently Scottish folk artist Karine Polwart and Julie Fowlis use the instrument, using it on some of their songs. Singers find it very useful as an accompaniment and instrumentalists enjoy the drone reference it gives to play along with.

See also

Electronic tanpura
Sruti upanga, a Tamil bagpipe used to provide a drone
Electronic musical instrument

References

External links

Pocket Shruti Box (Android app) produces Tambura drone based on a physical model developed by researchers at the Sonic Arts Research Center of Queen's University Belfast. 
Shruti Box videos Videos of professional Shruti boxes in action.
Yashagana Shruti Box Free Software Online/WINDOWS/Linux/Mobile/iPhone/Android.
tanpura mp3 downloads free tanpura mp3 downloads from Matthew Rahaim (sa-pa and sa-ma)  A, B, C, C, D

Indian musical instruments
Carnatic music instruments
Hindustani musical instruments